Jacqueline Badran (born 12 November 1961 in Sydney, Australia; place of origin in Zurich and Auswil) is a Swiss-Australian businesswoman and a politician of the Social Democratic Party of Switzerland (SP).

Early life and education 
Badran was born 12. November 1961 in Sydney, New South Wales, Australia to a Swiss mother and a Lebanese-born Australian father. By virtue of birth she holds dual-citizenship in Switzerland and Australia. Her father is the founder of Badran's in Wollongong. At the age of five, Jacqueline Badran moved with her parents and her sister to Zurich, Switzerland. There her parents operated several dry cleaning stores. He had a prosperous upbringing in Zürich's district 7. After her parents divorced, her father moved back to Lebanon and her mother married a Count Fabbricotti, nobility that originated in Livorno, Italy.

She attended primary school and the cantonal school. After two years in between traveling and exercising, she studied biology at the University of Zurich and graduated with a diploma. Following she studied economics and political sciences at the University of St. Gallen. At the University of St.Gallen she was also involved in the environmental student initiative OIKOS. During her studies she taught others how to ski or was employed at the counter of a cinema. In 2000 she founded Zeix AG with two partners and since 2004 she is the CEO of the software company.

Political career 
In 1991 she joined the Social Democratic Party (SP) for which she was elected to the municipal council in of Zurich 2002 in which she stayed until 2011. She was elected to the Swiss National Council in the Swiss parliamentary elections in 2011 and re-elected in the parliamentary elections in 2015 and 2019. In January 2020, she announced her candidacy for the vice presidency of the SP, but under the pre-condition that Mattea Meyer and Cedric Wermuth would become the Co-Presidents. Since December 2020, she is the vice-president of the SP. Following an exhaustive, but successful campaign against the abolishment of the Issuance Tax, she announced a pause from politics for a few months.

Political positions 
She became known nationally as a local politician in Zurich through her consistent and successful fight against the abolition of the Lex Koller, which permitted non-residents of Switzerland, to own land in Switzerland. On several occasions she has been strongly committed to working out counter-proposals to popular initiatives.

Personal life 
Her father had emigrated to Australia in the 1920s where he established his own textile company. He met Jacqueline Badran's mother on a business trip to the Zurich Hotel Baur au Lac. Her mother worked as a secretary at Bally while her father lived in Switzerland until she was twelve, following which he returned to Lebanon alone. She is married to Victor Badran, a Dutch bicycle-messenger who adopted the surname of his wife. She is a dual Australian-Swiss citizen. Badran survived serious disasters twice. In 1993, she was buried by an avalanche in the Engadin. And on the 24 November 2001 she survived an airplane crash near Bassersdorf, which killed 24 people.

References 

1961 births
Politicians from Sydney
University of Zurich alumni
Social Democratic Party of Switzerland politicians
Members of the National Council (Switzerland)
Living people
Politicians from Zürich